Aukes is a surname. Notable people with the surname include:

Rachel Aukes, American novelist
Douwe Aukes (1612–1668), Frisian sea captain